Tanner Anderson, born 1993, is an American professional baseball pitcher.

Tanner Anderson may also refer to:

 Tanner Anderson (Celestiial), a member of the doom metal band
 Tanner Anderson, several runners